The round-tailed manakin (Ceratopipra chloromeros) is a species of bird in the family Pipridae. It is found in Bolivia, Brazil, and Peru. Its natural habitats are subtropical or tropical moist lowland forest and subtropical or tropical moist montane forest.

References

round-tailed manakin
Birds of the Bolivian Amazon
Birds of the Peruvian Amazon
Birds of the Yungas
round-tailed manakin
Taxonomy articles created by Polbot